The 2014–15 Baylor Lady Bears basketball team will represent Baylor University in the 2014–15 NCAA Division I women's basketball season. Returning as head coach is Hall of Famer Kim Mulkey for her 14th season. The team plays its home games at the Ferrell Center in Waco, Texas and were members of the Big 12 Conference. They finish the season 33–4, 16–2 in Big 12 to win the Big 12 regular season title. They also won the Big 12 women's tournament to earn an automatic trip to the NCAA women's tournament where they defeated Northwestern State in the first round, Arkansas in the second round and Iowa in the sweet sixteen before losing to Notre Dame in the elite eight.

Before the season

Departures

Recruiting

Roster

Rankings

Schedule

|-
! colspan=9 style="background:#FECB00; color:#003015;"|Exhibition

|-
!colspan=9 style="background:#004834; color:#FECB00;"| Non-conference Regular Season

|-
!colspan=9 style="background:#FECB00; color:#003015;"| Big 12 Regular Season

|-
!colspan=9 style="background:#004834; color:#FDBB2F;" | 2015 Big 12 women's basketball tournament

|-
!colspan=9 style="background:#004834; color:#FDBB2F;" | NCAA women's tournament

Source

See also
 2014–15 Baylor Bears basketball team

References

Baylor
Baylor Bears women's basketball seasons
Baylor